is a professional Japanese baseball player. He plays outfielder for the Tohoku Rakuten Golden Eagles.

References 

1995 births
Living people
Baseball people from Kōchi Prefecture
Rissho University alumni
Japanese baseball players
Nippon Professional Baseball outfielders
Yomiuri Giants players
Tohoku Rakuten Golden Eagles players